Mohlakeng is a township west of Johannesburg in Gauteng, South Africa.

History
The township was established in 1954. The new location of Mohlakeng was established after African residents of the then old Randfontein township of Madubulaville was abolished by the apartheid regime to make way for the industrial site closer to Randfontein town.

Geography
Mohlakeng is where the large part of the Randfontein population is situated.  It lies 7 kilometres south of Randfontein, and around 38 kilometres West of Johannesburg. Mohlakeng has now grown about 15% in size in 2012 as compared to 2002.  The former Executive Mayor of The West Rand District Municipality hails from Mohlakeng.

Attractions
Mohlakeng is home to some of the most popular nightlife spots. Rooftop Junxion, a new establishment at Extension 5 is among these.

Infrastructure
The community is served with a post office, police station, Mohlakeng Medical Centre, a refurbished Ramosa Hall, an all-purpose sports stadium and a recreation centre. Mohlakeng is surrounded by Soweto in the east, Randfontein in the north and Westonaria in the south. Mohlakeng is accessible by the R28 Main Reef Road and the R559 Main Road.

Education
There are four high schools and eight primary schools in Mohlakeng.

Notable people
Other well-known people from Mohlakeng include: Terror Mathebula, the first African World WBA Light-Weight Boxing Champion, Oupa Manyisa, Andrew Mathiya, Donald Khuse, the late footballer Patrick Ntsoelengoe and Roger Majafa and Thembi Kgatlana and Linda Motlhalo.

References

Townships in Gauteng
Populated places in the Rand West City Local Municipality